Joko Mardianto  (born 1965) is a former Indonesian badminton player in the late 1980s to early 1990s.

Profile 
Joko Mardianto is a doubles specialist, namely men's doubles and mixed doubles. At the 1989 Southeast Asian Games, Mardianto won a bronze medal in the men's doubles with Aryono Miranat and a silver medal for the men's team. His brilliant career continued after successfully winning the mixed doubles number with Sri Untari at the 1992 Asian Badminton Championships.

Achievements

Asian Championships 

Mixed doubles

Southeast Asian Games 

Men's doubles

IBF International 
Men's doubles

References 

1965 births
Living people
Indonesian male badminton players
Competitors at the 1989 Southeast Asian Games
Southeast Asian Games silver medalists for Indonesia
Southeast Asian Games bronze medalists for Indonesia